Gills Rock is an unincorporated community located on Highway 42 at the northern tip of the Door Peninsula in Door County, Wisconsin, United States. It is within the town of Liberty Grove and was formerly known as Hedgehog Harbor.

History
This area is known to the Potawatomi as Wah-ya-qua-kah-me-kong, for "head of the land" or "land's end". Today the area is named for Elias Gill, a local 19th century landowner.

Gills Rock has a strong history and tradition of commercial fishing, which continues to this day. Death's Door Maritime Museum is located there. The area is also popular with scuba divers who explore the many shipwrecks in and around Death's Door, the narrow strait connecting Lake Michigan to Green Bay, also known as Porte des Morts. The Pilot Island Light is located on Pilot Island near Gills Rock.

Gills Rock is also the departure point of a ferry to Washington Island.

In popular culture
The town is the birthplace of fictional character Gwen Raiden from the TV series Angel.

Education
Gibraltar Area Schools serves the community. Gibraltar Elementary School and Gibraltar Secondary School are the two schools.

Climate

Images

References

Bogue, Margaret Beattie. Around the Shores of Lake Michigan A Guide to Historic Sites (1985, University of Wisconsin Press)

External links
Google Maps - Aerial View
Door County Chamber of Commerce - General Information

Unincorporated communities in Wisconsin
Unincorporated communities in Door County, Wisconsin